Elders with Andrew Denton is a television interview show broadcast on ABC1 in Australia.

The program was the brainchild of Australian comedian, social critic, producer and media personality Andrew Denton, who hosted the show. The hour-long chat show aired from 2008 to 21 December 2009.

Overview

Following on from his very successful long-form, no holds barred TV interview series Enough Rope, Elders also featured Denton's signature disarming, in-depth interviews, this time with the focus on people who had come into the public eye by becoming 'elders' of their communities, however and wherever that had happened. Denton and his guests covered topics ranging from the topical to the deeply personal, and explored the worldwide, pre-historical phenomenon of 'elder status' in the guests' cultures and communities, as well as the up- and down-sides of being regarded as an 'elder', and the changing nature of and social significance of these roles.

'Elders' allowed Denton and his team an opportunity to focus on members of society who were notable but not necessarily famous enough to have been included on 'Enough Rope'.

The show initially competed against the very popular Australian Story airing at 8pm on Mondays on both ABC Radio National and ABC Local Radio.

For the series, Denton and his team recorded extensive interviews with his guests all over the world, from New York, London, and Dhaka, to Alice Springs in Central Australia. The show's guests generously gave their own time to the sometimes gruelling recording schedules and follow-up process, and to the pre-interview research crew, as well as fully and unguardedly engaging with Denton during the interviews themselves.

External links 
 Elders with Andrew Denton on the ABC

Australian television talk shows
Australian Broadcasting Corporation original programming
2008 Australian television series debuts
2009 Australian television series endings